Gambrus is a genus of wasps belonging to the family Ichneumonidae. The genus was first described by Förster in 1868 and has cosmopolitan distribution.

Species 
 Gambrus amoenus  Gravenhorst, 1829
 Gambrus antefurcalis (Constantineanu & Constantineanu, 1968)
 Gambrus aphrodite (Heinrich, 1949)
 Gambrus apicatus (Provancher, 1874)
 Gambrus biannulator (Constantineanu 1973)
 Gambrus bipunctatus (Tschek, 1872)
 Gambrus bituminosus (Cushman, 1924)
 Gambrus canadensis (Provancher, 1875)
 Gambrus carnifex (Gravenhorst, 1829)
 Gambrus conjungens (Tschek, 1871)
 Gambrus extrematis (Cresson, 1864)
 Gambrus incubitor  Linnaeus, 1758 
 Gambrus madronio  Kasparyan & Ruiz-Cancino, 2005 
 Gambrus ornatus (Gravenhorst, 1829)
 Gambrus polyphemi  Förster 1868 
 Gambrus ruficoxatus (Sonan, 1930)
 Gambrus rufithorax (Constantineanu & Constantineanu, 1968)
 Gambrus tricolor  (Gravenhorst, 1829)
 Gambrus tunicularuber  (Fyles, 1896)
 Gambrus ultimus (Cresson, 1864)
 Gambrus varians (Brischke, 1891)
 Gambrus variator (Walker, 1874)
 Gambrus wadai (Uchida, 1936)
 Gambrus wileyi  Brambila, 1997
 Gambrus yukonensis  Townes, 1962

References

Cryptinae
Ichneumonidae genera